General Ponsonby may refer to:

Frederick Cavendish Ponsonby (1783–1837), British Army major general
Henry Ponsonby (1825–1895), British Army major general
John Ponsonby (British Army officer) (1866–1952), British Army major general
William Ponsonby (British Army officer) (1772–1815), British Army major general